is a Japanese football player who last played for Estonian Meistriliiga club Viljandi Tulevik.

Club career

Latvia
Before the start of the 2012 Latvian Higher League season Saito signed a contract with FB Gulbene. Soon after joining he made a great impact, scoring all of his team's goals in the first round of the championship. All in all he scored 9 goals in 14 matches for Gulbene and was the club's leading scorer. In June 2012 Saito went on trial with the Azerbaijan Premier League club Khazar Lankaran, but he wasn't offered a contract then. On July 1, 2012 he signed a contract with the Latvian Higher League club FK Ventspils. Scoring 6 goals in 17 matches for Ventspils, all in all, Saito became the second top-scorer of the Latvian Higher League in 2012 with 15 goals in 31 matches.

FC Ufa
After the successful season in Ventspils Saito moved to the Russian National Football League club FC Ufa in February 2013.

Viljandi Tulevik
On 23 February 2018, Saitō signed a  contract with Estonian Meistriliiga club Viljandi Tulevik. On 1 May 2018 he left the club due to family reasons.

Club statistics

References

External links

1988 births
Living people
Association football people from Tokyo
Japanese footballers
Association football forwards
J1 League players
Japan Football League players
Japanese expatriate footballers
Meistriliiga players
Expatriate footballers in Singapore
Expatriate footballers in Latvia
Expatriate footballers in Russia
Expatriate footballers in Belarus
Expatriate soccer players in Australia
Expatriate footballers in Estonia
Japanese expatriate sportspeople in Singapore
Japanese expatriate sportspeople in Latvia
Japanese expatriate sportspeople in Russia
Japanese expatriate sportspeople in Belarus
Japanese expatriate sportspeople in Australia
Japanese expatriate sportspeople in Estonia
Yokohama F. Marinos players
Zweigen Kanazawa players
Albirex Niigata Singapore FC players
FB Gulbene players
FK Ventspils players
FC Ufa players
FC Slutsk players
Riga FC players
Caroline Springs George Cross FC players
Viljandi JK Tulevik players